Aikenway Castle was a castle about  north of Charlestown of Aberlour, Moray, Scotland, south of the river Spey.

Little remains of the castle.

History
The history of the castle is not known.  Traces of the castle, including a west turret survived until 1870.  A brother of Earl Leslie of Rothes is said to have occupied it.

The last occupants recorded were Margaret and Christian Leslie, in 1729.

Structure
The castle was built on a steep promontory above a loop on the river.   It was naturally defended on three sides; there is evidence of artificial scraping on the narrow ridge by which the castle may be approached from the other side.

The castle is said to have been lined with oak panels, and gained its name from this.

References

Castles in Moray